The 2015–16 CERH Women's European Cup was the 10th season of Europe's premier club roller hockey competition organized by CERH.
In this season, the number of teams increased to sixteen form seven National Associations.

Teams
TH: Title holders

Results
The draw was held at CERH headquarters in Lisbon, Portugal, on 6 September 2015.

Final four
The final four tournament took place on 19 and 20 March 2016 in Manlleu, Spain.

Semi-finals

Final

See also
2015–16 CERH European League
2015–16 CERS Cup

References

External links
 

Rink Hockey European Female League
2016 in Spanish women's sport
2015 in Spanish women's sport
International roller hockey competitions hosted by Spain
CERH
CERH